Tree-class trawlers were a class of anti-submarine naval trawlers which served in the Royal Navy during the Second World War. They were nearly identical to the s, of which they are usually considered a subclass.

Six Tree-class trawlers were lost during the war: Almond, Ash, Chestnut, Hickory, Juniper and Pine. One, Mangrove, was transferred to Portugal in 1943.

By the end of 1946, only Olive and Walnut remained in service with the Royal Navy. Both were sold in 1948.

Ships in class
 Built by Ardrossan Dockyard Company, Ardrossan, UK
  - Launched 1940, sold 1946
  - Launched 1940, war loss 1941
 Built by Cochrane & Sons, Ltd., Selby, UK
  - Launched 1939, war loss 1941
  - Launched 1939, sold 1946
 Built by Cook, Welton & Gemmell, Beverley, UK
  - Launched 1939, sold 1946
  - launched 1939, sold 1946
 Built by Ferguson Brothers, Ltd., Port Glasgow, UK
  - Launched 15 December 1939, commissioned 9 March 1940; sunk in the Norwegian Sea, 8 June 1940.
  - Launched 4 April 1942, transferred to Portugal 1943 as Faial (P2)
Built by Goole Shipbuilding & Repair Company, Goole, UK
  - Launched 1940, war loss 1940
  - Launched 1940, sold 1946
 Built by Hall, Russell & Company, Aberdeen, UK
  - Launched 26 February 1940, sold 1948
  - Launched 1940, war loss 1944
 Built by A. & J. Inglis, Ltd., Glasgow, UK (part of Harland and Wolff)
  - Launched 1939, sold 1946
  - Launched 1940, sold 1946
 Built by Henry Robb, Ltd., Leith, UK
  - Launched 1939, sold 1946
  - Launched 1940, war loss 1940
 Built by Smith's Dock Company, Ltd., South Bank-on-Tees, UK
  - Launched 1939, sold 1946
 Walnut - Launched 1939, sold 1948 as Baltic refugee ship
  - Launched 1939, sold 1946
  - Launched 1939, sold 1946

References

See also
 
 
 
 Shakespearian-class trawler
 Trawlers of the Royal Navy

Mine warfare vessel classes
 
Ship classes of the Royal Navy